Frizzled is a family of atypical G protein-coupled receptors that serve as receptors in the Wnt signaling pathway and other signaling pathways. When activated, Frizzled leads to activation of Dishevelled in the cytosol.

Species distribution

Frizzled proteins and the genes that encode them have been identified in an array of animals, from sponges to humans.

Function

Frizzled proteins also play key roles in governing cell polarity, embryonic development, formation of neural synapses, cell proliferation, and many other processes in developing and adult organisms.  These processes occur as a result of one of three signaling pathways.  These include the canonical Wnt/β-catenin pathway, Wnt/calcium pathway, and planar cell polarity (PCP) pathway.  Mutations in the human frizzled-4 receptor have been linked to familial exudative vitreoretinopathy, a rare disease affecting the retina at the back of the eye, and the vitreous, the clear fluid inside the eye.

The frizzled (fz) locus of Drosophila coordinates the cytoskeletons of epidermal cells, producing a parallel array of cuticular hairs and bristles. In fz mutants, the orientation of individual hairs with respect both to their neighbours and to the organism as a whole is altered. In the wild-type wing, all hairs point towards the distal tip.

In the developing wing, Fz has 2 functions: it is required for the proximal-distal transmission of an intracellular polarity signal; and it is required for cells to respond to the polarity signal. Fz produces an mRNA that encodes an integral membrane protein with 7 putative transmembrane (TM) domains. This protein should contain both extracellular and cytoplasmic domains, which could function in the transmission and interpretation of polarity information. This signature is usually found downstream of the Fz domain

Cysteine-rich domain

Frizzled proteins include cysteine-rich domain that is conserved in diverse proteins, including several receptor tyrosine kinases. In Drosophila melanogaster, members of the Frizzled family of tissue-polarity genes encode proteins that appear to function as cell-surface receptors for Wnts. The Frizzled genes belong to the seven transmembrane class of receptors (7TMR) and have in their extracellular region a cysteine-rich domain that has been implicated as the Wnt binding domain. Sequence similarity between the cysteine-rich domain of Frizzled and several receptor tyrosine kinases, which have roles in development, include the muscle-specific receptor tyrosine kinase (MuSK), the neuronal-specific kinase (NSK2), and ROR1 and ROR2. The structure of this domain is known and is composed mainly of alpha helices. This domain contains ten conserved cysteines that form five disulphide bridges.

Group members

The following is a list of the ten known human frizzled receptors:

 Frizzled-1
 Frizzled-2
 Frizzled-3
 Frizzled-4
 Frizzled-5
 Frizzled-6
 Frizzled-7
 Frizzled-8
 Frizzled-9
 Frizzled-10

As a drug target
Vantictumab is a monoclonal antibody against five frizzled receptors that is under development for the treatment of cancer.

See also
 Smoothened

References

External links

 

G protein-coupled receptors